Raffles, the Amateur Cracksman (1925) is a feature length silent adventure crime drama/romance motion picture starring House Peters, Miss DuPont, Hedda Hopper, Fred Esmelton, and Walter Long.

Directed by King Baggot and produced by Carl Laemmle's Universal Pictures, the screenplay was adapted by Harvey F. Thew from the play by Eugene W. Presbrey and the 1899 short story collection, The Amateur Cracksman, by E.W. Hornung.

Background 
The play on which the film was based was written by E.W. Hornung and Eugene Presbrey. A successful production played at the Princess Theatre in New York from 27 October 1903 for 168 performances before touring. Raffles was played by Kyrle Bellew and Manders by Stanton Elliot.

Plot
Raffles (played by House Peters) is an English gentleman with a secret life—he is the notorious jewel thief known as "The Amateur Cracksman." While sailing from India to England accompanied by his friend, Bunny Manners (played by Freeman Wood), it is rumored that the infamous cracksman is aboard ship. Raffles warns a lady passenger to keep an eye on her necklace, which is stolen soon afterward. Although a search reveals no evidence, the necklace is returned upon reaching London.

Lord Amersteth (played by Winter Hall) and his wife, Lady Amersteth (played by Kate Lester), are having a party at their home and Raffles attends. Another guest, noted criminologist Captain Bedford (played by Fred Esmelton), makes the assertion that a very valuable string of pearls cannot be stolen. Encouraged by this, Raffles steals it.

He has also stolen the heart of Gwendolyn Amersteth (played by Miss DuPont), the daughter of his hosts. Capt. Bedford finally captures him, but he escapes with Gwendolyn's help and they run away to be married. Raffles returns the pearls and promises to retire from being a burglar.

Cast

References

External links

Raffles, the Amateur Cracksman at the AFI Catalog of Feature Films

1925 films
American crime drama films
American silent feature films
American black-and-white films
1925 crime drama films
1920s romance films
American films based on plays
Films based on British novels
Works based on A. J. Raffles
Films directed by King Baggot
Films based on multiple works
Films set in England
Universal Pictures films
Films set in London
1920s American films
Silent American drama films
1920s English-language films